Ospina is a town and municipality in Nariño Department, Colombia.

Ospina may also refer to:

People
 Camilo Ospina Bernal (born 1959), Colombian lawyer and politician
 Carlos Wyld Ospina (1891–1956),  Guatemalan novelist, essayist, and poet
 Daniel Samper Ospina (born 1974), Colombian writer, journalist, and columnist
 David Ospina (born 1988), Colombian footballer
 Germán Ospina (born 1972), Colombian cyclist
 Hernando Calvo Ospina (born 1961), Colombian journalist and writer
 Iván Marino Ospina (fl. 1966–1985), Colombian revolutionary
 John Paul Ospina (born 1980), Colombian entertainer
 Jorge Iván Ospina (born 1965), Colombian politician
 Luciano Ospina (born 1991), Colombian footballer
 Mariano Ospina Pérez (1891–1976), Colombian politician
 Mariano Ospina Rodríguez (1805–1885), Colombian politician, journalist, and lawyer
 Nadín Ospina (born 1960), Colombian artist
 Pedro Nel Ospina Vázquez (1858–1927), Colombian general and political figure
 Santander Ospina (born 1974), Colombian footballer
 William Ospina (born 1954), Colombian poet, essayist, and novelist

Other uses
 Ospina Coffee Company, Colombian firm